The Espace 620 (English: Space) is a French trailerable sailboat that was designed by the Jeanneau Design Office as a cruiser and first built in 1983. The boat is part of the Espace series of cruising sailboats and its designation indicates its length overall in centimeters.

Production
The design was built by Jeanneau in France, from 1983 until 1986 with 30 boats completed, but it is now out of production.

Design
The Espace 620 is a recreational keelboat, built predominantly of fiberglass. It has a masthead sloop rig with aluminum spars and stainless steel wire rigging. The hull has a raked stem, a plumb transom, a transom-hung rudder controlled by a tiller and a fixed fin keel or optional twin keels or stub keel and retractable centerboard. It displaces  and carries  of ballast.

The boat has a draft of  when fitted with the standard fin keel.

The boat may be optionally fitted with an inboard engine or a small outboard motor for docking and maneuvering.

The design has sleeping accommodation for four people, with a double "V"-berth in the bow cabin and a drop-down double dinette. The galley is located on the starboard side just forward of the companionway ladder. The galley is equipped with a two-burner stove and a sink. The enclosed head is located just aft of the bow cabin on the starboard side.

For sailing downwind the design may be equipped with a symmetrical spinnaker.

See also
List of sailing boat types

References

External links

Keelboats
1980s sailboat type designs
Sailing yachts
Trailer sailers
Sailboat type designs by Jeanneau Design Office
Sailboat types built by Jeanneau